Jean Rotz, also called Johne Rotz, was a 16th-century French artist-cartographer. He was born to a Scottish father and a French mother.

Career
Rotz was a member of the school of the Dieppe maps. He may have accompanied Jean Parmentier to Sumatra in 1529, and he definitely went to Brazil in 1539.
His work was greatly influenced by these early French explorations, which induced him to create highly decorative maps.

Failing to find employment with King Francois I, Rotz went to England in 1542 and entered the service of Henry VIII. He presented Henry with his manuscript atlas, the Boke of Idrography, which contained a two-hemisphere world map. This map showed the distraits of magallane (Strait of Magellan), the two Unfortunate Islands (Insulas desfortunadas), unnamed on the map, discovered during Ferdinand Magellan's voyage across the Pacific, and the strait between Lytel Java (Java Minor) and the Londe of Java (Java Major) through which the Victoria, the last surviving ship of Magellan's expedition, was thought to have passed on the return voyage to Spain. 

In the early nineteenth century, the resemblance of his Londe of Java to Australia was noted. Charles Ernest Coquebert de Montbret, having been able to examine the Rotz atlas at the British Museum during a visit to London following the Peace of Amiens in 1802, claimed in a lecture to the Société Philomathique de Paris in 1803 that its Londe  of Java was evidence of a discovery of the east coast of Australia by Portuguese based in the Moluccas, who perhaps were accompanied by French seafarers who thereby found the opportunity to obtain the intelligence upon which the map, and others of the Dieppe school, was prepared. His claim was refuted by Frédéric Metz in a letter to the Revue Philosophique, Littéraire et Politique of 11 Novembre 1805. Metz noted the absence of New Guinea and  the Gulf of Carpentaria, and pointed out that a chart that recorded the voyage of navigators who had gone as far as the southern extremity of the east coast of Australia could not have failed to indicate the breadth of sea that separated Australia from Java, whereas the Rotz map showed only a narrow channel between the two. 

The Italian traveler Ludovico di Varthema visited Java in 1506 and said it “prope in inmensum patet (extends almost beyond measure)”. Rotz apparently identified this “Java patalis” with the Regio Patalis, a huge promontory of the Terra Australis, depicted on the 1531 world map of the royal cosmographer, Oronce Fine.

See also
France-Asia relations

Notes

16th-century cartographers
16th-century French people
French cartographers
French hydrographers
Year of birth missing
Year of death missing